Christoph (Keller) Cellarius (22 November 1638 – 4 June 1707) was a German classical scholar from Schmalkalden who held positions in Weimar and Halle. Although the Ancient-Medieval-Modern division of history was used earlier by Italian Renaissance scholars Leonardo Bruni and Flavio Biondo, Cellarius' Universal History Divided into an Ancient, Medieval, and New Period helped popularize it. After him, this tripartite division became standard.

The library of the University of Applied Sciences in Schmalkalden bears his name, it is called the "Cellarius Bibliothek", in honor of Cellarius.

Bibliography 
 Johann Wolfgang von Goethe, Memoirs of Goethe, Cellarius,  Printed for Henry Colburn (London), 1824.

See also
 Universal history
 Periodization

1638 births
1707 deaths
People from Schmalkalden
17th-century Latin-language writers
18th-century Latin-language writers
18th-century German male writers
German classical scholars
People from the Landgraviate of Hesse-Kassel
University of Giessen alumni
Academic staff of the University of Halle
University of Jena alumni